The 1868 United States presidential election in Missouri took place on November 3, 1868, as part of the 1868 United States presidential election. Voters chose 11 representatives, or electors, to the Electoral College, who voted for president and vice president.

Missouri was won by Ulysses S. Grant, formerly the 6th Commanding General of the United States Army (R-Ohio), running with Speaker of the House Schuyler Colfax, with 56.96% of the popular vote, against the 18th governor of New York, Horatio Seymour (D–New York), running with former Senator Francis Preston Blair Jr., with 43.04% of the vote.

Grant's victory in Missouri made him the first Republican presidential candidate to win the state, although President Abraham Lincoln had won the state on the National Union ticket in 1864. Grant would also be the only Republican to carry the state until Theodore Roosevelt won it in 1904.

Results

See also
 United States presidential elections in Missouri

References

Missouri
1868
1868 Missouri elections